The 1986 Critérium du Dauphiné Libéré was the 38th edition of the cycle race and was held from 25 May to 1 June 1986. The race started in Annecy and finished in Nyons. The race was won by Urs Zimmermann of the Carrera team.

Teams
Thirteen teams, containing a total of 113 riders, participated in the race:

 
 
 
 
 
 
 Miko
 
 
 
 
 
 Colombia amateur team

Route

General classification

References

Further reading

1986
May 1986 sports events in Europe
June 1986 sports events in Europe
1986 in French sport
1986 Super Prestige Pernod International